The Makarewa River is the largest tributary of the Ōreti River, and is in Southland, New Zealand.

Rivers of Southland, New Zealand
Rivers of New Zealand